The 1957–58 season was Dinamo București's ninth season in Divizia A. Because of the competitional system change to fall-spring, in the first half of 1957, Dinamo participated in the Spring Cup, competition where they finished third in the Second Group, and failed to qualify in the final stage. In the championship, Dinamo ended sixth, the worst result in the last seven championships.

Results

Transfers 

Dinamo transferred in Cornel Popa and Vasile Alexandru from Dinamo Bacău, Iosif Lazăr from Dinamo Oraşul Stalin and Gheorghe Cosma from Progresul. The new manager, Iuliu Baratky, promotes Ion Motroc and Petre Babone from the second team. Gheorghe and Ladislau Băcuț, and Florea Birtașu are transferred out.

References 
 www.labtof.ro
 www.romaniansoccer.ro

1957
Association football clubs 1957–58 season
1957–58 in Romanian football